Giovanni Battista Bolognini (1611–1688) was an Italian painter and engraver of the Baroque.

Biography
He was born and died at Bologna. He was a pupil of Guido Reni. He painted a Virgin and child with St Dominic, St Eustatius, and Mary Magdalene for Santa Maria Nuova. He painted a Dead Christ mourned by the Virgin, St. John, and others; an Immaculate Conception for the church of Santa Lucia. He etched a Murder of the Innocents, a St Peter named Head of the Church; a Bacchus and Ariadne; and The Crucifixion after Reni.

He was uncle and teacher of the Bolognese painter Giacomo Bolognini.

References

1611 births
1688 deaths
17th-century Italian painters
Italian male painters
Italian engravers
Painters from Bologna
Italian Baroque painters